The Olympic and Sports Committee of the Comoros (IOC code: COM) is the National Olympic Committee representing Comoros.

See also
 Comoros at the Olympics

References

Comoros
Comoros at the Olympics